Gina Naomi Baez is an American actor, singer, songwriter, and YouTuber. With a flourishing acting career having landed roles in Spike Lee's She's Gotta Have It, Orange is the New Black and most recently CBS's FBI.  She has appeared in numerous Off-Broadway and regional stage plays including as Celia in Rattlesnake Kate, Esmeralda in The Hunchback of Notre Dame, Dulcinea del Toboso in Man of La Mancha, and Agnes in A Taste of Things to Come (among others). Baez has also seen great success with her YouTube channel which has built an impressive following. Her infamous "Lizzo's Truth Hurts x Hocus Pocus" parody music video went viral after LIZZO herself reposted it, as well as Bette Midler. She has also released several songs, including a 2015 EP (You and Me) and a variety of covers on her YouTube channel (often with Tinkerbelle the Dog).

Early life and education

Baez is a native of Rockville Centre, New York. She began singing as young as age six and started writing songs in eighth grade. Around that time, she was diagnosed with Hodgkin's lymphoma. She underwent chemotherapy and radiation therapy which caused her to lose her hair. While undergoing treatment, she founded the non-profit, Kids Performing Who Kare, which continues to exist and raise money for the NYU Winthrop Hospital's Cancer Center for Kids where she was treated. The non-profit puts on stage productions and concerts with children ages 6 to 18.
 
Baez attended South Side High School in Rockville Centre and graduated in 2006. She moved on to Pace University where she earned a Bachelor of Fine Arts in musical theatre in 2010. Prior to graduating college, Baez earned a role in Under Fire which ran during the New York Musical Theatre Festival (NYMF) at the Theater at St. Clement's in September and October 2009. In January 2010, she appeared in the ensemble cast for Pace's production of Quanah at the Schaeberle Studio.

Career

After college, one of Baez's first roles came as Anna Leonowens in an August 2010 production of The King and I with the St. Gregory Theater Group. In October 2010, she directed a production of the musical, 13 in association with the Rockville Centre Guild for the Arts. The following month, she and select cast members from a Kids Performing Who Kare production of Sweeney Todd were asked to perform for a benefit at the New World Stages theater. In October 2011, she played Jo March in a Rockville Centre Guild for the Arts production of Little Women.
 
In September 2013, Baez premiered a music video for a song entitled, "Downtown," at a movie theater in Westbury, New York. Tinkerbelle the Dog was featured in the video. In January 2014, she released a video cover of the song "Let It Go" from the 2013 Disney film, Frozen. The video again featured an appearance from Tinkerbelle the Dog, who also appeared in the August 2014 music video for Baez's song, "Cupcakes." In November 2015, Baez independently released an EP entitled, You and Me.
 
In January 2016, she auditioned for and appeared in an episode of the 15th season of American Idol. She sang Meghan Trainor's "Lips Are Movin" but failed to progress beyond the judges. That month, she also had a leading role as Agnes Crookshank in a production of A Taste of Things to Come at the Bucks County Playhouse in New Hope, Pennsylvania. In June 2016, she appeared in a small role in an episode of the Netflix series, Orange is the New Black. The following month, she appeared as Nancy for a production of Oliver! at the Warehouse Theater at Fairfield Theatre Company in Fairfield, Connecticut. In September 2017, she earned a role as one of the street urchins, Chiffon, in a production of Little Shop of Horrors at the Fulton Theatre in Lancaster, Pennsylvania.
 
In May 2018, Baez appeared in Women on Fire: Stories from the Frontlines at the off-Broadway Royal Family Arts Space. In November 2018, she took on the role of Esmeralda for a production of The Hunchback of Notre Dame at the Argyle Theatre in Babylon, New York. In 2019, she will have a recurring role as Marisol in the second season of Spike Lee's Netflix series, She's Gotta Have It.

Credits

Theatre

Television

Film

Discography

EPs

Singles

References

External links

Year of birth missing (living people)
Living people
Pace University alumni
American Idol participants
YouTubers from New York (state)
American women singer-songwriters
American actresses
South Side High School (Rockville Centre) alumni
People from Rockville Centre, New York
21st-century American women